Elkanah is a figure in the First Book of Samuel, the husband of Hannah and father of Samuel.

Elkanah may also refer to:

 A Levite, ancestor of a certain Berechiah. (1 Chronicles 9: 16)
 A Levite, son of the rebellious Korah and brother of Abiasaph. (Exodus 6: 24)
 A Levite, descendant of Korah, who "came to David at Ziklag while he was still under restrictions because of Saul". (1 Chronicles chapter 12)
 A Levite, descendant from Korah through Abiasaph, mentioned as the great grandfather of the next. (1 Chronicles chapter 6)
 A Levite, mentioned as the great great great grandfather of Elkanah, Samuel's father.
 One of the gatekeepers of the Ark of the Covenant, when David transferred it to Jerusalem. (1 Chronicles chapter 15)
 An official in king Ahaz' court. (2 Chronicles chapter 28)

See also Elkana or Elqana, a Jewish settlement in the northern West Bank.

Elkanah/Elkana can also be a surname or a male forename.

Some notable people with the first name Elkanah:
 Elkanah Settle (1648-1724) English poet and playwright
 Elkanah Billings (1820-1876) Canada's first paleontologist
 Elkanah Watson (1758-1842) American writer, agriculturalist and canal promoter
 Elkanah Angwenyi (born 1983) Kenyan 1500m runner
 Elkanah Armitage (1794-1876) British industrialist and Liberal politician.
 Elkanah Greer (1825-1877) American cotton planter and general
 Elkanah Young (1804-1876) Nova Scotia merchant and politician
 Elkanah Onyeali (died 2008) Nigerian footballer
 Elkanah Tisdale (1768-1835) American engraver and cartoonist
 Elkanah Kelsey Dare (1782-1826) American hymn composer

Some notable people surnamed Elkana:
 Amos Elkana (born 1967) Israeli composer, guitarist and electronic musician
 Yehuda Elkana (1934-2012) Israeli historian and philosopher of science, President of the Central European University in Budapest.